Norway competed at the 1932 Summer Olympics in Los Angeles, United States.  It was the first time that no Norwegian athletes won any medals at the Games.

References
Official Olympic Reports
International Olympic Committee results database

Nations at the 1932 Summer Olympics
1932
1932 in Norwegian sport